Solidarity Park is located opposite Parliament House in Perth, Western Australia. In 1997 a "Workers Embassy" was set up on some vacant land opposite the Parliament House during union protests of the Court Governments "third wave" legislation for industrial relations. What began with a caravan and portable barbecue soon transformed into a landscaped shelter with a monument to the trade union workers who have died during their work. Special mention was made to Mark Allen, a young CFMEU organiser who was killed on a building site while attempting to get workers down from an unsafe roof.

See also
 Kevin Reynolds

References
 Nearly a year and Embassy still stands .W.A. construction worker, Autumn 1998, p. 37,  - referring to both the - Solidarity Park (Perth, W.A.) and the Workers' Embassy (Perth, W.A.)
 The Workers Embassy Scrapbook.  Papers in labour history, No. 20 (Aug. 1998), entire issue devoted to issue.

Parks in Perth, Western Australia
West Perth, Western Australia